Tà Lùng is a township of Quảng Hòa District, Cao Bằng Province, Vietnam. It is a border trade town with Shuikou in China.

References

Populated places in Cao Bằng province
Townships in Vietnam